The koala or, inaccurately, koala bear (Phascolarctos cinereus), is an arboreal herbivorous marsupial native to Australia. It is the only extant representative of the family Phascolarctidae and its closest living relatives are the wombats. The koala is found in coastal areas of the mainland's eastern and southern regions, inhabiting Queensland, New South Wales, Victoria, and South Australia. It is easily recognisable by its stout, tailless body and large head with round, fluffy ears and large, spoon-shaped nose. Fur colour ranges from silver grey to chocolate brown. Koalas from the northern populations are typically smaller and lighter in colour than their counterparts further south. These populations possibly are separate subspecies, but this is disputed.

Koalas typically inhabit open Eucalyptus woodland, as the leaves of these trees make up most of their diet. This eucalypt diet has low nutritional and caloric content and contains toxins that deter most other mammals from feeding on it. Koalas are largely sedentary and sleep up to twenty hours a day. They are asocial animals, and bonding exists only between mothers and dependent offspring. Adult males communicate with loud bellows that intimidate rivals and attract mates. Males mark their presence with secretions from scent glands located on their chests. Being marsupials, koalas give birth to underdeveloped young that crawl into their mothers' pouches, where they stay for the first six to seven months of their lives. These young koalas, known as joeys, are fully weaned around a year old. Koalas have few natural predators and parasites, but are threatened by various pathogens, such as Chlamydiaceae bacteria and koala retrovirus.

Because of its distinctive appearance, the koala along with the kangaroos are recognised worldwide as symbols of Australia. They were hunted by Indigenous Australians and depicted in myths and cave art for millennia. The first recorded encounter between a European and a koala was in 1798, and an image of the animal was published in 1810 by naturalist George Perry. Botanist Robert Brown wrote the first detailed scientific description of the koala in 1814, although his work remained unpublished for 180 years. Popular artist John Gould illustrated and described the koala, introducing the species to the general British public. Further details about the animal's biology were revealed in the 19th century by several English scientists. Koalas are listed as a vulnerable species by the International Union for Conservation of Nature. Among the many threats to their existence are habitat destruction caused by agriculture, urbanisation, droughts, and associated bushfires, some related to climate change.  In February of 2022, the koala was officially listed as endangered in the Australian Capital Territory, New South Wales, and Queensland.

Etymology
The word koala comes from the Dharug gula, meaning no water.  Although the vowel 'u' was originally written in the English orthography as "oo" (in spellings such as coola or koolah — two syllables), the spelling later became "oa" and the word is now pronounced in three syllables, possibly in error. 

Adopted by white settlers, "koala" became one of several hundred Aboriginal loan words in Australian English, where it was also commonly referred to as "native bear", later "koala bear", for its supposed resemblance to a bear. It is also one of several Aboriginal words that made it into International English, alongside e.g. "didgeridoo" and "kangaroo." The generic name, Phascolarctos, is derived from the Greek words phaskolos "pouch" and arktos "bear". The specific name, cinereus, is Latin for "ash coloured".

Taxonomy and evolution

The koala was given its generic name Phascolarctos in 1816 by French zoologist Henri Marie Ducrotay de Blainville, who would not give it a specific name until further review. In 1819, German zoologist Georg August Goldfuss gave it the binomial Lipurus cinereus. Because Phascolarctos was published first, according to the International Code of Zoological Nomenclature, it has priority as the official name of the genus. French naturalist Anselme Gaëtan Desmarest proposed the name Phascolarctos fuscus in 1820, suggesting that the brown-coloured versions were a different species than the grey ones. Other names suggested by European authors included Marodactylus cinereus by Goldfuss in 1820, P. flindersii by René Primevère Lesson in 1827, and P. koala by John Edward Gray in 1827.

The koala is classified with wombats (family Vombatidae) and several extinct families (including marsupial tapirs, marsupial lions and giant wombats) in the suborder Vombatiformes within the order Diprotodontia. The Vombatiformes are a sister group to a clade that includes macropods (kangaroos and wallabies) and possums. The ancestors of vombatiforms were likely arboreal, and the koala's lineage was possibly the first to branch off around 40 million years ago during the Eocene.

The modern koala is the only extant member of Phascolarctidae, a family that once included several genera and species. During the Oligocene and Miocene, koalas lived in rainforests and had less specialised diets. Some species, such as the Riversleigh rainforest koala (Nimiokoala greystanesi) and some species of Perikoala, were around the same size as the modern koala, while others, such as species of Litokoala, were one-half to two-thirds its size. Like the modern species, prehistoric koalas had well developed ear structures which suggests that long-distance vocalising and sedentism developed early. During the Miocene, the Australian continent began drying out, leading to the decline of rainforests and the spread of open Eucalyptus woodlands. The genus Phascolarctos split from Litokoala in the late Miocene and had several adaptations that allowed it to live on a specialised eucalyptus diet: a shifting of the palate towards the front of the skull; larger molars and premolars; smaller pterygoid fossa; and a larger gap between the molar and the incisor teeth.

P. cinereus may have emerged as a dwarf form of the giant koala (P. stirtoni). The reduction in the size of large mammals has been seen as a common phenomenon worldwide during the late Pleistocene, and several Australian mammals, such as the agile wallaby, are traditionally believed to have resulted from this dwarfing. A 2008 study questions this hypothesis, noting that P. cinereus and P. stirtoni were sympatric during the middle to late Pleistocene, and possibly as early as the Pliocene. The fossil record of the modern koala extends back at least to the middle Pleistocene.

Genetics and variations
Three subspecies are recognised: the Queensland koala (Phascolarctos cinereus adustus, Thomas 1923), the New South Wales koala (Phascolarctos cinereus cinereus, Goldfuss 1817), and the Victorian koala (Phascolarctos cinereus victor, Troughton 1935). These forms are distinguished by pelage colour and thickness, body size, and skull shape. The Queensland koala is the smallest of the three, with shorter, silver fur and a shorter skull. The Victorian koala is the largest, with shaggier, brown fur and a wider skull. The boundaries of these variations are based on state borders, and their status as subspecies is disputed. A 1999 genetic study suggests that the variations represent differentiated populations with limited gene flow between them and that the three subspecies comprise a single evolutionarily significant unit. Other studies have found that koala populations have high levels of inbreeding and low genetic variation. Such low genetic diversity may have been a characteristic of koala populations since the late Pleistocene. Rivers and roads have been shown to limit gene flow and contribute to the genetic differentiation of southeast Queensland populations. In April 2013, scientists from the Australian Museum and Queensland University of Technology announced they had fully sequenced the koala genome.

Characteristics and adaptations

The koala is a stocky animal with a large head and vestigial or non-existent tail. Koalas from Victoria are twice as heavy as those from Queensland. The species is sexually dimorphic, with males 50% larger than females. Males are further distinguished from females by their more curved noses and the presence of chest glands, which are visible as hairless patches. As in most marsupials, the male koala has a bifurcated penis, and the female has two lateral vaginas and two separate uteri. The male's penile sheath contains naturally occurring bacteria that play an important role in fertilisation. The female's pouch opening is tightened by a sphincter that keeps the young from falling out.

The pelage of the koala is thicker and longer on the back, and shorter on the belly. The ears have thick fur on both the inside and outside. The back fur colour varies from light grey to chocolate brown.  The belly fur is whitish; on the rump it is dappled whitish, and darker at the back. The koala has the most effective insulating back fur of any marsupial and is highly resilient to wind and rain, while the belly fur can reflect solar radiation. The koala's curved, sharp claws are well adapted for climbing trees. The large forepaws have two opposable digits (the first and second, which are opposable to the other three) that allow them to grasp small branches. On the hind paws, the second and third digits are fused, a typical condition for members of the Diprotodontia, and the attached claws (which are still separate) are used for grooming. As in humans and other primates, koalas have friction ridges on their paws. The animal has a sturdy skeleton and a short, muscular upper body with proportionately long upper limbs that contribute to its climbing and grasping abilities. Additional climbing strength is achieved with thigh muscles that attach to the shinbone lower than other animals. The koala has a cartilaginous pad at the end of the spine that may make it more comfortable when it perches in the fork of a tree.

The koala has one of the smallest brains in proportion to body weight of any mammal, being 60% smaller than that of a typical diprotodont, weighing only  on average. The brain's surface is fairly smooth, typical for a "primitive" animal. It occupies only 61% of the cranial cavity and is pressed against the inside surface by cerebrospinal fluid. The function of this relatively large amount of fluid is not known, although one possibility is that it acts as a shock absorber, cushioning the brain if the animal falls from a tree. The koala's small brain size may be an adaptation to the energy restrictions imposed by its diet, which is insufficient to sustain a larger brain. Because of its small brain, the koala has a limited ability to perform complex, unfamiliar behaviours. For example, when presented with plucked leaves on a flat surface, the animal cannot adapt to the change in its normal feeding routine and will not eat the leaves. The koala's olfactory senses are normal, and it is known to sniff the oils of individual branchlets to assess their edibility. Its nose is fairly large and covered in leathery skin. Its round ears provide it with good hearing, and it has a well-developed middle ear. A koala's vision is not well developed, and its relatively small eyes are unusual among marsupials in that the pupils have vertical slits. Koalas make use of a novel vocal organ to produce low-pitched sounds (see social spacing, below). Unlike typical mammalian vocal cords, which are folds in the larynx, these organs are placed in the velum (soft palate) and are called velar vocal cords.

The koala has several adaptations for its eucalypt diet, which is of low nutritive value, high toxicity, and high in dietary fibre. The animal's dentition consists of the incisors and cheek teeth (a single premolar and four molars on each jaw), which are separated by a large gap (a characteristic feature of herbivorous mammals). The incisors are used for grasping leaves, which are then passed to the premolars to be snipped at the petiole before being passed to the highly cusped molars, where they are shredded into small pieces. Koalas may also store food in their cheek pouches before it is ready to be chewed. The partially worn molars of middle-aged koalas are optimal for breaking the leaves into small particles, resulting in more efficient stomach digestion and nutrient absorption in the small intestine, which digests the eucalyptus leaves to provide most of the animal's energy. A koala sometimes regurgitates the food into the mouth to be chewed a second time.

Unlike kangaroos and eucalyptus-eating possums, koalas are hindgut fermenters, and their digestive retention can last for up to 100 hours in the wild or up to 200 hours in captivity. Koalas can select which food particles to retain for longer fermentation and which to pass through. Large particles typically pass through more quickly, as they would take more time to digest. While the hindgut is proportionally larger in the koala than in other herbivores, only 10% of the animal's energy is obtained from fermentation. Since the koala gains a low amount of energy from its diet, its metabolic rate is half that of a typical mammal, although this can vary between seasons and sexes. They can digest the toxins present in eucalyptus leaves due to their production of cytochrome P450, which breaks down these poisons in the liver. The koala conserves water by passing relatively dry faecal pellets high in undigested fibre, and by storing water in the caecum.

Distribution and habitat
It extends throughout eastern and southeastern Australia, encompassing northeastern, central and southeastern Queensland, eastern New South Wales, Victoria, and southeastern South Australia. The koala was reintroduced near Adelaide and on several islands, including Kangaroo Island and French Island. The population on Magnetic Island represents the northern limit of its range. Fossil evidence shows that the koala's range stretched as far west as southwestern Western Australia during the late Pleistocene. Koalas were introduced to Western Australia at Yanchep. They were likely driven to extinction in these areas by environmental changes and hunting by Indigenous Australians. In South Australia, koalas were only known to exist in recent times in the lower South East, with a remnant population in the Bangham Forest between Bordertown and Naracoorte, until introduced to the Mount Lofty Ranges in the 20th-century. Doubts have been cast on Eyre's identification as koala pelt a girdle being worn by an Aboriginal man, the only evidence of their recent existence elsewhere in the State.

Koalas can be found in habitats ranging from relatively open forests to woodlands, and in climates ranging from tropical to cool temperate. In semi-arid climates, they prefer riparian habitats, where nearby streams and creeks provide refuge during times of drought and extreme heat.
In a recent overview of koala research, Clode has noted that, despite their name, koala distribution is strongly linked to water. Their fossil distribution is associated with swamp forest habitats, their preferred feed trees tend to have relatively high water needs (e.g. river red gum), their distribution in forests and abundance over time is closely linked to the availability of water and their breeding success is often linked with riparian habitats.

Ecology and behaviour

Foraging and activities

Koalas are herbivorous, and while most of their diet consists of eucalypt leaves, they can be found in trees of other genera, such as Acacia, Allocasuarina, Callitris, Leptospermum, and Melaleuca. Though the foliage of over 600 species of Eucalyptus is available, the koala shows a strong preference for around 30. They tend to choose species that have a high protein content and low proportions of fibre and lignin. The most favoured species are Eucalyptus microcorys, E. tereticornis, and E. camaldulensis, which, on average, make up more than 20% of their diet. They will also consume other species in the genus such as E. ovata, E. punctata, and E. viminalis. Despite its reputation as a fussy eater, the koala is more generalist than some other marsupial species, such as the greater glider. Since eucalypt leaves have a high water content, the koala does not need to drink often; its daily water turnover rate ranges from 71 to 91 ml/kg of body weight. Although females can meet their water requirements by eating leaves, larger males require additional water found on the ground or in tree hollows. When feeding, a koala holds onto a branch with hind paws and one forepaw while the other forepaw grasps foliage. Small koalas can move close to the end of a branch, but larger ones stay near the thicker bases. Despite their adaptations to a low-energy lifestyle, they have meagre fat reserves and need to feed often.

Because they get so little energy from their diet, koalas must limit their energy use and sleep or rest 20 hours a day. They are predominantly active at night and spend most of their waking hours feeding. They typically eat and sleep in the same tree, possibly for as long as a day. On very hot days, a koala may climb down to the coolest part of the tree which is cooler than the surrounding air. The koala hugs the tree to lose heat without panting. On warm days, a koala may rest with its back against a branch or lie on its stomach or back with its limbs dangling. During cold, wet periods, it curls itself into a tight ball to conserve energy. On windy days, a koala finds a lower, thicker branch on which to rest. While it spends most of the time in the tree, the animal descends to the ground to move to another tree. The koala usually grooms itself with its hind paws, but sometimes uses its forepaws or mouth.

Social spacing

Koalas are asocial animals and spend just 15 minutes a day on social behaviours. In Victoria, home ranges are small and have extensive overlap, while in central Queensland they are larger and overlap less. Koala society appears to consist of "residents" and "transients", the former being mostly adult females and the latter males. Resident males appear to be territorial and dominate others with their larger body size. Alpha males tend to establish their territories close to breeding females, while younger males are subordinate until they mature and reach full size. Adult males occasionally venture outside their home ranges; when they do so, dominant ones retain their status. When a male enters a new tree, he marks it by rubbing his chest gland against the trunk or a branch; males have occasionally been observed to dribble urine on the trunk. This scent-marking behaviour probably serves as communication, and individuals are known to sniff the base of a tree before climbing. Scent marking is common during aggressive encounters. Chest gland secretions are complex chemical mixtures—about 40 compounds were identified in one analysis—that vary in composition and concentration with the season and the age of the individual.

Adult males communicate with loud bellows—low pitched sounds that consist of snore-like inhalations and resonant exhalations that sound like growls. These sounds are thought to be generated by unique vocal organs found in koalas. Because of their low frequency, these bellows can travel far through air and vegetation. Koalas may bellow at any time of the year, particularly during the breeding season, when it serves to attract females and possibly intimidate other males. They also bellow to advertise their presence to their neighbours when they enter a new tree. These sounds signal the male's actual body size, as well as exaggerate it; females pay more attention to bellows that originate from larger males. Female koalas bellow, though more softly, in addition to making snarls, wails, and screams. These calls are produced when in distress and when making defensive threats. Young koalas squeak when in distress. As they get older, the squeak develops into a "squawk" produced both when in distress and to show aggression. When another individual climbs over it, a koala makes a low grunt with its mouth closed. Koalas make numerous facial expressions. When snarling, wailing, or squawking, the animal curls the upper lip and points its ears forward. During screams, the lips retract and the ears are drawn back. Females bring their lips forward and raise their ears when agitated.

Agonistic behaviour typically consists of squabbles between individuals climbing over or passing each other. This occasionally involves biting. Males that are strangers may wrestle, chase, and bite each other. In extreme situations, a male may try to displace a smaller rival from a tree. This involves the larger aggressor climbing up and attempting to corner the victim, which tries either to rush past him and climb down or to move to the end of a branch. The aggressor attacks by grasping the target by the shoulders and repeatedly biting him. Once the weaker individual is driven away, the victor bellows and marks the tree. Pregnant and lactating females are particularly aggressive and attack individuals that come too close. In general, however, koalas tend to avoid energy-wasting aggressive behaviour.

Reproduction and development

Koalas are seasonal breeders, and births take place from the middle of spring through the summer to early autumn, from October to May. Females in oestrus tend to hold their heads further back than usual and commonly display tremors and spasms. However, males do not appear to recognise these signs and have been observed to mount non-oestrous females. Because of his much larger size, a male can usually force himself on a female, mounting her from behind, and in extreme cases, the male may pull the female out of the tree. A female may scream and vigorously fight off her suitors but will submit to one that is dominant or is more familiar. The bellows and screams that accompany matings can attract other males to the scene, obliging the incumbent to delay mating and fight off the intruders. These fights may allow the female to assess which is dominant. Older males usually have accumulated scratches, scars, and cuts on the exposed parts of their noses and their eyelids.

The koala's gestation period lasts 33–35 days, and a female gives birth to a single joey (although twins occur on occasion). As with all marsupials, the young are born while at the embryonic stage, weighing only . However, they have relatively well-developed lips, forelimbs, and shoulders, as well as functioning respiratory, digestive, and urinary systems. The joey crawls into its mother's pouch to continue the rest of its development. Unlike most other marsupials, the koala does not clean her pouch.

A female koala has two teats; the joey attaches itself to one of them and suckles for the rest of its pouch life. The koala has one of the lowest milk energy production rates, relative to body size, of any mammal. The female makes up for this by lactating for as long as 12 months. At seven weeks of age, the joey's head grows longer and becomes proportionally large, pigmentation begins to develop, and its sex can be determined (the scrotum appears in males and the pouch begins to develop in females). The eyes begin to open and fine fur grows on the forehead, nape, shoulders, and arms. At 26 weeks, the fully furred animal resembles an adult and begins to poke its head out of the pouch.

As the young koala approaches six months, the mother begins to prepare it for its eucalyptus diet by predigesting the leaves, producing a faecal pap that the joey eats from her cloaca. The pap is quite different in composition from regular faeces, resembling instead the contents of the caecum, which has a high concentration of bacteria. Eaten for about a month, the pap provides a supplementary source of protein at a transition time from a milk to a leaf diet. The joey fully emerges from the pouch for the first time at six or seven months of age, when it weighs . It explores its new surroundings cautiously, clinging to its mother for support. Having permanently left the pouch, it rides on its mother's back for transportation, learning to climb by grasping branches. Her bond with her previous offspring is permanently severed and she no longer allows it to suckle, but it will continue to live near her for the next 6–12 months.

Females become sexually mature at about three years of age and can then become pregnant; in comparison, males reach sexual maturity when they are about four years old, although they can produce sperm as early as two years. While the chest glands can be functional as early as 18 months of age, males do not begin scent-marking behaviours until they reach sexual maturity. Because the offspring have a long dependent period, female koalas usually breed in alternate years. Favourable environmental factors, such as a plentiful supply of high-quality food trees, allow them to reproduce every year.

Health and mortality
Koalas may live from 13 to 18 years in the wild. While female koalas usually live this long, males may die sooner because of their more hazardous lives. Koalas usually survive falls from trees and immediately climb back up, but injuries and deaths from falls do occur, particularly in inexperienced young and fighting males. Around six years of age, the koala's chewing teeth begin to wear down and their chewing efficiency decreases. Eventually, the cusps disappear completely and the animal will die of starvation. Koalas have few predators; dingos and large pythons may prey on them; birds of prey (such as powerful owls and wedge-tailed eagles) are threats to young. Koalas are generally not subject to external parasites, other than ticks in coastal areas. Koalas may also suffer mange from the mite Sarcoptes scabiei, and skin ulcers from the bacterium Mycobacterium ulcerans, but neither is common. Internal parasites are few and largely harmless. These include the tapeworm Bertiella obesa, commonly found in the intestine, and the nematodes Marsupostrongylus longilarvatus and Durikainema phascolarcti, which are infrequently found in the lungs. In a three-year study of almost 600 koalas admitted to the Australia Zoo Wildlife Hospital in Queensland, 73.8% of the animals were infected with at least one species of the parasitic protozoal genus Trypanosoma, the most common of which was T. irwini.

Koalas can be subject to pathogens such as Chlamydiaceae bacteria, which can cause keratoconjunctivitis, urinary tract infection, and reproductive tract infection. Such infections are widespread on the mainland, but absent in some island populations. The koala retrovirus (KoRV) may cause koala immune deficiency syndrome (KIDS) which is similar to AIDS in humans. Prevalence of KoRV in koala populations suggests a trend spreading from the north to the south of Australia. Northern populations are completely infected, while some southern populations (including Kangaroo Island) are free.

The animals are vulnerable to bushfires due to their slow movements and the flammability of eucalypt trees. The koala instinctively seeks refuge in the higher branches, where it is vulnerable to intense heat and flames. Bushfires also fragment the animal's habitat, which restricts their movement and leads to population decline and loss of genetic diversity. Dehydration and overheating can also prove fatal. Consequently, the koala is vulnerable to the effects of climate change. Models of climate change in Australia predict warmer and drier climates, suggesting that the koala's range will shrink in the east and south to more mesic habitats.

Human relations

History

The first written reference to the koala was recorded by John Price, servant of John Hunter, the Governor of New South Wales. Price encountered the "cullawine" on 26 January 1798, during an expedition to the Blue Mountains, although his account was not published until nearly a century later in Historical Records of Australia. In 1802, French-born explorer Francis Louis Barrallier encountered the animal when his two Aboriginal guides, returning from a hunt, brought back two koala feet they were intending to eat. Barrallier preserved the appendages and sent them and his notes to Hunter's successor, Philip Gidley King, who forwarded them to Joseph Banks. Similar to Price, Barrallier's notes were not published until 1897. Reports of the first capture of a live "koolah" appeared in The Sydney Gazette in August 1803. Within a few weeks Flinders' astronomer, James Inman, purchased a specimen pair for live shipment to Joseph Banks in England. They were described as 'somewhat larger than the Waumbut (Wombat)'. These encounters helped provide the impetus for King to commission the artist John Lewin to paint watercolours of the animal. Lewin painted three pictures, one of which was subsequently made into a print that was reproduced in Georges Cuvier's Le Règne Animal (The Animal Kingdom) (first published in 1817) and several European works on natural history.

Botanist Robert Brown was the first to write a detailed scientific description of the koala in 1803, based on a female specimen captured near what is now Mount Kembla in the Illawarra region of New South Wales. Austrian botanical illustrator Ferdinand Bauer drew the animal's skull, throat, feet, and paws. Brown's work remained unpublished and largely unnoticed, however, as his field books and notes remained in his possession until his death, when they were bequeathed to the British Museum (Natural History) in London. They were not identified until 1994, while Bauer's koala watercolours were not published until 1989. British surgeon Everard Home included details of the koala based on eyewitness accounts of William Paterson, who had befriended Brown and Bauer during their stay in New South Wales. Home, who in 1808 published his report in the journal Philosophical Transactions of the Royal Society, gave the animal the scientific name Didelphis coola.

The first published image of the koala appeared in George Perry's (1810) natural history work Arcana. Perry called it the "New Holland Sloth" on account of its perceived similarities to the Central and South American tree-living mammals of the genus Bradypus. His disdain for the koala, evident in his description of the animal, was typical of the prevailing early 19th-century British attitude about the primitiveness and oddity of Australian fauna: ...  the eye is placed like that of the Sloth, very close to the mouth and nose, which gives it a clumsy awkward appearance, and void of elegance in the combination ... they have little either in their character or appearance to interest the Naturalist or Philosopher. As Nature however provides nothing in vain, we may suppose that even these torpid, senseless creatures are wisely intended to fill up one of the great links of the chain of animated nature ...

Naturalist and popular artist John Gould illustrated and described the koala in his three-volume work The Mammals of Australia (1845–1863) and introduced the species, as well as other members of Australia's little-known faunal community, to the general British public. Comparative anatomist Richard Owen, in a series of publications on the physiology and anatomy of Australian mammals, presented a paper on the anatomy of the koala to the Zoological Society of London. In this widely cited publication, he provided the first careful description of its internal anatomy, and noted its general structural similarity to the wombat. English naturalist George Robert Waterhouse, curator of the Zoological Society of London, was the first to correctly classify the koala as a marsupial in the 1840s. He identified similarities between it and its fossil relatives Diprotodon and Nototherium, which had been discovered just a few years before. Similarly, Gerard Krefft, curator of the Australian Museum in Sydney, noted evolutionary mechanisms at work when comparing the koala to its ancestral relatives in his 1871 The Mammals of Australia.

The first living koala in Britain arrived in 1881, purchased by the Zoological Society of London. As related by prosecutor to the society, William Alexander Forbes, the animal suffered an accidental demise when the heavy lid of a washstand fell on it and it was unable to free itself. Forbes used the opportunity to dissect the fresh female specimen, thus was able to provide explicit anatomical details on the female reproductive system, the brain, and the liver—parts not previously described by Owen, who had access only to preserved specimens. Scottish embryologist William Caldwell—well known in scientific circles for determining the reproductive mechanism of the platypus—described the uterine development of the koala in 1884, and used the new information to convincingly place the koala and the monotremes into an evolutionary time frame.

Cultural significance

The koala is well known worldwide and is a major draw for Australian zoos and wildlife parks.  It has been featured in advertisements, games, cartoons, and as soft toys. It benefited the national tourism industry by over an estimated billion Australian dollars in 1998, a figure that has since grown. In 1997, half of the visitors to Australia, especially those from Korea, Japan, and Taiwan, sought out zoos and wildlife parks; about 75% of European and Japanese tourists placed the koala at the top of their list of animals to see. According to biologist Stephen Jackson: "If you were to take a straw poll of the animal most closely associated with Australia, it's a fair bet that the koala would come out marginally in front of the kangaroo". Factors that contribute to the koala's enduring popularity include its childlike body proportions and teddy bear-like face.

The koala is featured in the Dreamtime stories and mythology of Indigenous Australians. The Tharawal people believed that the animal helped row the boat that brought them to the continent. Another myth tells of how a tribe killed a koala and used its long intestines to create a bridge for people from other parts of the world. This narrative highlights the koala's status as a game animal and the length of its intestines. Several stories tell of how the koala lost its tail. In one, a kangaroo cuts it off to punish the koala for being lazy and greedy. Tribes in both Queensland and Victoria regarded the koala as a wise animal and sought its advice. Bidjara-speaking people credited the koala for turning barren lands into lush forests. The animal is also depicted in rock carvings, though not as much as some other species. 

Early European settlers in Australia considered the koala to be a prowling sloth-like animal with a "fierce and menacing look". At the beginning of the 20th century, the koala's reputation took a more positive turn, largely due to its growing popularity and depiction in several widely circulated children's stories. It is featured in Ethel Pedley's 1899 book Dot and the Kangaroo, in which it is portrayed as the "funny native bear". Artist Norman Lindsay depicted a more anthropomorphic koala in The Bulletin cartoons, starting in 1904. This character also appeared as Bunyip Bluegum in Lindsay's 1918 book The Magic Pudding. Perhaps the most famous fictional koala is Blinky Bill. Created by Dorothy Wall in 1933, the character appeared in several books and has been the subject of films, TV series, merchandise, and a 1986 environmental song by John Williamson. The first Australian stamp featuring a koala was issued by the Commonwealth in 1930. A television ad campaign for Australia's national airline Qantas, starting in 1967 and running for several decades, featured a live koala (voiced by Howard Morris), who complained that too many tourists were coming to Australia and concluded "I hate Qantas". The series has been ranked among the greatest commercials of all time.

The song "Ode to a Koala Bear" appears on the B-side of the 1983 Paul McCartney/Michael Jackson duet single Say Say Say. A koala is the main character in Hanna-Barbera's The Kwicky Koala Show and Nippon Animation's Noozles, both of which were animated cartoons of the early 1980s. Food products shaped like the koala include the Caramello Koala chocolate bar and the bite-sized cookie snack Koala's March. Dadswells Bridge in Victoria features a tourist complex shaped like a giant koala and the Queensland Reds rugby team has a koala as its mascot. The Platinum Koala and Australian Silver Koala coins feature the animal on the reverse and Elizabeth II on the obverse.

The drop bear is an imaginary creature in contemporary Australian folklore featuring a predatory, carnivorous version of the koala. This hoax animal is commonly spoken about in tall tales designed to scare tourists. While koalas are typically docile herbivores, drop bears are described as unusually large and vicious marsupials that inhabit treetops and attack unsuspecting people (or other prey) that walk beneath them by dropping onto their heads from above.

Koala diplomacy
Prince Henry, Duke of Gloucester, visited the Koala Park Sanctuary in Sydney in 1934 and was "intensely interested in the bears". His photograph, with Noel Burnet, the founder of the park, and a koala, appeared in The Sydney Morning Herald. After World War II, when tourism to Australia increased and the animals were exported to zoos overseas, the koala's international popularity rose. Several political leaders and members of royal families had their pictures taken with koalas, including Queen Elizabeth II, Prince Harry, Crown Prince Naruhito, Crown Princess Masako, Pope John Paul II, US President Bill Clinton, Soviet premier Mikhail Gorbachev and South African President Nelson Mandela 

At the 2014 G20 Brisbane summit, hosted by Prime Minister Tony Abbott, many world leaders including Russian President Vladimir Putin and US President Barack Obama were photographed holding koalas. The event gave rise to the term "koala diplomacy", which then became the Oxford Word of the Month for December 2016. 
The term also includes the loan of koalas by the Australian government to overseas zoos in countries such as Singapore and Japan, as a form of "soft power diplomacy", like the "panda diplomacy" practised by China.

Conservation issues

The koala was originally classified as Least Concern on the Red List, and reassessed as Vulnerable in 2014. In the Australian Capital Territory, New South Wales and Queensland, the species was listed under the EPBC Act in February 2022 as endangered by extinction. The described population was determined in 2012 to be "a species for the purposes of the EPBC Act 1999" in Federal legislation.

Australian policymakers had declined a 2009 proposal to include the koala in the Environment Protection and Biodiversity Conservation Act 1999. In 2012, the Australian government listed koala populations in Queensland and New South Wales as Vulnerable, because of a 40% population decline in the former and a 33% decline in the latter. A 2017 WWF report found a 53% decline per generation in Queensland, and a 26% decline in New South Wales. The koala population in South Australia and Victoria and appear to be abundant; however, the Australian Koala Foundation (AKF) argued that the exclusion of Victorian populations from protective measures was based on a misconception that the total koala population was 200,000, whereas they believed in 2012 that it was probably less than 100,000. AKF estimated in 2022 that there could be as few as 43,000 individuals. This is compared with 8 to 10 million at the start of the 20th century. The Australian Government's Threatened Species Scientific Committee estimated that the 2021 koala population was 92,000, down from 185,000 two decades prior.

The koala was heavily hunted by European settlers in the early 20th century, largely for its thick, soft fur. More than two million pelts are estimated to have left Australia by 1924. Pelts were in demand for use in rugs, coat linings, muffs, and as trimming on women's garments. The first successful efforts at conserving the species were initiated by the establishment of Brisbane's Lone Pine Koala Sanctuary and Sydney's Koala Park Sanctuary in the 1920s and 1930s. The owner of the latter park, Noel Burnet, became the first to successfully breed koalas and earned a reputation as the foremost contemporary authority on the marsupial.

One of the biggest anthropogenic threats to the koala is habitat destruction and fragmentation. In coastal areas, the main cause of this is urbanisation, while in rural areas, habitat is cleared for agriculture. Native forest trees are also taken down to be made into wood products. In 2000, Australia ranked fifth in the world by deforestation rates, having cleared . The distribution of the koala has shrunk by more than 50% since European arrival, largely due to fragmentation of habitat in Queensland. Nevertheless, koalas live in many protected areas. 

While urbanisation can pose a threat to koala populations, the animals can survive in urban areas provided enough trees are present. Urban populations have distinct vulnerabilities: collisions with vehicles and attacks by domestic dogs. To reduce road deaths, government agencies have been exploring various wildlife crossing options, such as the use of fencing to channel animals toward an underpass, in some cases adding a ledge as a walkway to an existing culvert. Dogs kill about 4,000 animals every year. Injured koalas are often taken to wildlife hospitals and rehabilitation centres. In a 30-year retrospective study performed at a New South Wales koala rehabilitation centre, trauma (usually resulting from a motor vehicle accident or dog attack) was found to be the most frequent cause of admission, followed by symptoms of Chlamydia infection.

See also
 Fauna of Australia
 List of monotremes and marsupials of Australia
 Sam (koala), a female koala known for being rescued during the Black Saturday bushfires in 2009

References

External links

 Arkive – images and movies of the koala Phascolarctos cinereus
 Animal Diversity Web – Phascolarctos cinereus
iNaturalist crowdsourced koala sighting photos (mapped, graphed)
 Koala Science Community
 "Koala Crunch Time" – an ABC documentary (2012)
 "Koalas deserve full protection"
 Cracking the Koala Code – a PBS Nature documentary (2012)
 The Aussie Koala Ark Conservation Project

 
Articles containing video clips
Clawed herbivores
Extant Middle Pleistocene first appearances
Herbivorous mammals
Mammals described in 1817
Mammals of New South Wales
Mammals of Queensland
Mammals of South Australia
Mammals of Victoria (Australia)
Marsupials of Australia
Vombatiforms